José Cleonâncio da Fonseca (14 December 1936 – 1 January 2021) was a Brazilian politician.

Biography
Fonseca was born on Monday, 14 December 1936, in Boquim, Sergipe.

He served as a federal deputy for Sergipe and Mayor of Boquim.

Fonseca died around 12:05 AM (03:05 GMT) on Friday, a New Year's Day of 2021, in Aracaju, Sergipe.

References

External links
 Legislative profile

1936 births
2021 deaths
20th-century Brazilian politicians
21st-century Brazilian politicians
Members of the Chamber of Deputies (Brazil) from Sergipe
Members of the Legislative Assembly of Sergipe
Brazilian city councillors
Mayors of places in Brazil
National Democratic Union (Brazil) politicians
National Renewal Alliance politicians
Democratic Social Party politicians
Reform Progressive Party politicians
Brazilian Democratic Movement politicians
Progressistas politicians

Democrats (Brazil) politicians
Christian Labour Party politicians
Brazilian Social Democracy Party politicians